Kessler is a television series produced by the BBC in 1981, starring Clifford Rose in the title role. The six-part serial is a sequel to the Second World War drama series Secret Army, set in contemporary times.

Plot
The story begins when a Belgian journalist, Hugo van Eyck (Jerome Willis), broadcasts a documentary about Nazi war criminals, and investigates the whereabouts of the former Chief of Gestapo and SS of Belgium, Sturmbannführer Ludwig Kessler (Clifford Rose) with the help of West German intelligence officer Richard Bauer (Alan Dobie). Kessler has changed his name to Manfred Dorf and is now a rich industrialist, with factories manufacturing plastics, explosives, and pharmaceutical products. His wartime Belgian mistress Madeleine Duclos (Hazel McBride) is deceased, but after the War the couple married and had a daughter, Ingrid (Alison Glennie). Kessler is part of an organisation called the Kameradenwerk, made up of Nazis on the run, trying to evade trial for their war crimes, led by Kessler’s close friend Colonel Hans Ruckert (Ralph Michael), a character based on Luftwaffe ace Colonel Hans Rudel.

Ingrid is sleeping with her father's manservant, Franz Hoss (Nicholas Young), and they are part of a group of young Neo-Nazis who dream of leading Germany back to Nazism.

Van Eyck invites three other Secret Army characters to his studios: Albert Foiret (Bernard Hepton), Monique Durnford (née Duchamps), (Angela Richards) and Natalie Chantrens (Juliet Hammond-Hill). Some of the serial's first scenes take place outside the Restaurant Candide in the Grand-Place in Brussels. The trio reminisce about their wartime activities running the resistance organisation Lifeline.  Monique and Natalie are certain that Dorf is Kessler, but Albert claims to be less sure.

Van Eyck and Bauer meet a young Israeli woman soldier called Mical Rak (Nitza Saul). Mical's mother's family was sent to Dachau to be killed, on Kessler's orders. Mical breaks into the grounds of Kessler's home to see him, but is discovered and forced to flee. Her companion Ruth Lieberman (Ishia Bennison) is murdered by the Kameradenwerk, and Van Eyck becomes their next victim. Mical is kidnapped from outside Kessler's London hotel and beaten by Franz, before being thrown into the River Thames. However, she survives and is rescued. Mical and Bauer team up to get Kessler. Bauer's agents break into Kessler's home and find a photo album, which proves he is Kessler. When it is discovered, Kessler, Ruckert, Franz, and Ingrid travel to Paraguay, and Bauer and Mical set off in pursuit. After a brief detour in Buenos Aires, the pair arrive in Ascunsion.

Kessler and Ruckert stay with a Nazi-sympathizing Paraguayan aristocrat, Don Julian Yqueras (played by Guy Rolfe, who previously appeared in the Secret Army episode, "Russian Roulette" as Oberst von Elmendorf). Yqueras is partly based on the former President of Argentina Juan Peron, a Nazi sympathizer who welcomed war criminals into his country and prevented their extradition, and partly on Paraguayan President Alfredo Stroessner - still in power in 1981 - who also allowed his country to become a safe haven for Nazi war criminals. Mical and Bauer stay with pigeon-fancier Jose Garriga (John Moreno), who quickly charms them and wins their friendship.

Ingrid and Franz meet fellow Nazis and discuss a plan to convince Kessler to take over their group and to bring with him a fund of 48 billion Deutschmarks, to be used to support the exiled Nazis. Kessler and Ruckert also meet their comrades, under the command of Martin Bormann, who does not appear on screen, apart from one arm. At the same meeting, Kessler is repulsed to be introduced to Josef Mengele (Oscar Quitak), Auschwitz's "Angel of Death". (In real life, Bormann had died in 1945, but this was not revealed until 1998. Similarly, Mengele had died in 1979, but this did not come to light until 1985.)

Kessler realizes that the Kameradenwerk are just too old and too tired to lead Germany back to Nazism. They care much about their own safety, little about building a new Nazi regime in Germany. After much soul-searching, Kessler decides to turn his back on them and turns instead to the young Nazis, agreeing to give them the Nazi fortune.

Deciding that Mical has become too much of a threat, Ruckert orders his followers to kill her. Ingrid and Franz go after her for the same reason. After killing Garriga, the assassins mistake Ingrid for Mical and shoot her and Franz dead, thereby killing the only people who could have resurrected Nazism. Mical and Bauer find their bodies and proceed to blow up the Nazi convoys, but Ruckert escapes. Mical and Bauer corner Kessler. After a discussion about the Holocaust and Communism, Bauer informs him of Ingrid's death. Mical tries to execute Kessler by shooting him in the back of the head but finds that she cannot do it. Mical and Bauer leave him alone, Bauer deliberately leaving his machine gun behind. Realizing that his dream of a new Nazi dawn is over, and having lost the one thing (their daughter Ingrid) that he had left of Madeleine, Kessler shoots himself in the mouth using Bauer's machine gun. Mical and Bauer return to find Kessler dead and draped in the Nazi Flag. Mical and Bauer finally leave knowing that the Nazis will never now get their hands on the billions and will never be able to return to power.

Cast 
 Ludwig Kessler - Clifford Rose
 Richard Bauer - Alan Dobie
 Mical Rak - Nitza Saul
 Ingrid Dorf - Alison Glennie
 Franz Hoss - Nicholas Young
 Colonel Hans Ruckert - Ralph Michael
 Albert Foiret - Bernard Hepton
 Monique Durnford - Angela Richards
 Natalie Chantrens - Juliet Hammond-Hill
 Don Julian Yqueras - Guy Rolfe
 Josef Mengele - Oscar Quitak
 Hugo van Eyck - Jerome Willis
 Jose Garriga - John Moreno
 Karl Leider - Robert Morris
 Gidney - Jeremy Wilkin
 Deakin - Harold Innocent
 Maurer - Royston Tickner
 Graun - John Dearth
 Ruth Lieberman - Ishia Bennison
 Heinrich Himmler - Robert Eddison
 Muller - Gareth Milne

Many former Secret Army production personnel were involved with Kessler, including producer Gerard Glaister, writer John Brason and directors Michael E. Briant and Tristan de Vere Cole.

Home media 
Kessler was released on DVD (Region 2, UK) by DD Home Entertainment, who had previously released the complete series of Secret Army as broadcast.

References

External links 
 
 , interviews and discussion of the series

1981 British television series debuts
1981 British television series endings
BBC television dramas
British television spin-offs
Belgium in fiction
Paraguay in fiction
World War II television drama series
Films about the Belgian Resistance
Television shows set in Belgium
Television shows set in Paraguay
Television shows set in Germany
Television shows set in London
English-language television shows
Cultural depictions of Heinrich Himmler
Cultural depictions of Josef Mengele